Kapil Mohan was an Indian entrepreneur and the chairman and managing director of Mohan Meakin, a brewer and distiller based in Ghaziabad. He was a recipient of the Vishisht Seva Medal and had served as a brigadier until the time of his retirement from the Indian Armed Forces.

Holder of a doctoral degree (PhD) and a former managing director of Trade Links Private Limited (1956-1966), Mohan was also a director of other group companies such as Arthos Breweries Limited, Mohan Rocky Springwater Breweries Limited, Sagar Sugars and Allied Products Limited, R. R. B. Energy Limited and Solchrome Systems India Limited. He was also the patron of General Mohyal Sabha, an organisation of the Mohyal community. He was honoured by the Government of India, in 2010, with the fourth-highest Indian civilian award of Padma Shri.

Personal life 
Mohan was married to Pushpa Mohan. Mohan was unwell over the last few years of his life, and had handed over day-to-day functioning of the various companies to his nephews, Hemant and Vinay Mohan. He died due to cardiac arrest on 6 January 2018.

References

External links
 

1929 births
2018 deaths
Recipients of the Padma Shri in trade and industry
Businesspeople from Uttar Pradesh
Indian chief executives